Andrew Davidson (February 12, 1840 – November 10, 1902) was a Scottish soldier who fought in the American Civil War. Davidson received the United States' highest award for bravery during combat, the Medal of Honor, for his action during the Battle of the Crater in Petersburg, Virginia on 30 July 1864. He was honored with the award on 17 October 1892.

Biography
Davidson was born in Morebattle, Scotland on 12 February 1840. He enlisted with the 121st New York Infantry on 23 August 1862. He was promoted to regimental Sergeant Major He was transferred to the 30th U.S. Colored Troops on 18 March 1864, where he was promoted to first lieutenant and later regimental adjutant on May 1, 1864. It was in this capacity that he performed the act of gallantry on 30 July 1864 that later earned him the Medal of Honor. By 10 December 1865 when Davidson was mustered out of the service, he had been promoted to captain and commander of Company B within his regiment.

After the war he was editor for a local newspaper, the Otsego Republican.   He was a companion of the New York Commandery of the Military Order of the Loyal Legion of the United States.  He also served as a member of the New York State Senate from 1884 to 1885. He died on 10 November 1902 and his remains are interred at the Lakewood Cemetery in New York.

Medal of Honor citation

See also

List of American Civil War Medal of Honor recipients: A–F

References

1840 births
1902 deaths
Scottish-born Medal of Honor recipients
People of New York (state) in the American Civil War
Union Army officers
United States Army Medal of Honor recipients
American Civil War recipients of the Medal of Honor
People from the Scottish Borders
New York (state) state senators
Burials at Lakewood Cemetery
19th-century American politicians